Cytora ampla is a species of small land snail with an operculum, a terrestrial gastropod mollusc in the family Pupinidae.

Distribution 
This species occur in New Zealand.

References

Pupinidae
Gastropods of New Zealand